Dozie is a surname. Notable people with the surname include:

Pascal Dozie (born 1939), Nigerian entrepreneur and businessman
Uzoma Dozie (born 1969), Nigerian banker, tech investor, and financial inclusion advocate

Surnames of Nigerian origin